Borax Lake is a  alkaline lake in the Alvord Desert of southeastern Oregon in the United States. Surface water temperatures usually range from  but occasionally go higher. The springs lie along the Steens fault zone, which runs north–south through the Alvord Valley east of Steens Mountain.

The lake contains high concentrations of borax (sodium borate), as well as arsenic and lead. Despite this, it is home to a unique species of fish, known as the Borax Lake chub. The species was formerly threatened by development of geothermal energy in the vicinity. However, in 1993 The Nature Conservancy bought  of private land, including the lake, in order to protect it; the U.S. Fish and Wildlife Service has designated  near the lake as critical habitat, and the Steens Mountain Cooperative Management and Protection Act of 2000 put the area around the lake off-limits to geothermal exploration and mining. The lake and nearby wetlands and water bodies such as Alvord Lake, north of the small community of Fields, provide important bird habitat.

History

In the late 19th century, a mining company called Rose Valley Borax bought the springs and the land around it. The company mined the borax for about 10 years. Wagons pulled by mule teams delivered the borax to a railway terminal in Winnemucca, Nevada. Ruins of buildings associated with borax mining, which ended here in 1902, remain near the lake in the 21st century.

Interest in mining for boron and other substances in the Alvord Lake basin rose again in the 1940s and 1950s. A geologist who took samples from hot springs in and near Borax Lake (then also called Hot Lake) reported in 1960 on the prospects for resumed commercial mining in the area. He estimated the total accumulation of borates from Borax Lake and another nearby hot springs at about  a year.

See also
 List of lakes in Oregon

References

External links
 Eastern Oregon Online – Portland Community College geology department

Lakes of Oregon
Lakes of Harney County, Oregon
Nature reserves in Oregon
Protected areas of Harney County, Oregon
Nature Conservancy preserves
Endorheic lakes of Oregon